Powder puff is a piece of soft material used for the application of powder. The term may also refer to one of the following:

Powderpuff (sports), female divisions for typically male sports, in some contexts
"Powder puff", a type of ballet tutu
Powder-puff plant (disambiguation), several plants
Powderpuff, a type of the Chinese Crested Dog breed
Powerpuff Girls, an American animated Superhero show